Country E.P. is a collaborative effort by Vermont-based folk artist Anaïs Mitchell and Chicago based Rachel Ries. It is both artists' first extended play. The five track E.P. was released on September 2, 2008 on CD with three of these tracks released on 7” vinyl. The 7” vinyl was only available from Righteous Babe Records' online store.

Track listing
 "O My Star!" – 3:03 
 "Mgd" – 3:19
 "Come September" – 3:07
 "Grace the Day" – 4:37
 "When You Fall" – 4:19

Personnel
 Anaïs Mitchell & Rachel Ries - guitar and vocals
 Billy Beard - drums
 Kimon Kirk - bass
 Dan Abu-Absi - mandolin
 Drew Lindsay - accordion
 Jesse Graber - violin
 John Hasbrouck - dobro on "Grace the Day"
 Mike Grigoni - dobro and pedal steel on "O My Star!" and "Come September"

2008 EPs
Anaïs Mitchell albums
Righteous Babe EPs